José María Tranquilino Almada y Quirós was an Imperial Mexican Colonel of the Second French intervention in Mexico. Popularly known as "Chato Almada", he was known for being one of the most prominent monarchist figures within the state of Sonora and for his victory at the Battle of Álamos.

Biography
He was born in this town in 1822 and was the son of the Governor of the Estado de Occidente, José María Almada. He had been a councilor of the City Council and in 1860 he took up arms in defense of the Government presided over by General Ignacio Pesqueira, during the rebellion led by Don Remigio Rivera. He commanded a section of the National Guard and defeated the Mayo rebels in Navojoa and pacified the Mayo River. The following year, he distanced himself from the local government due to the deaths of his brothers Vicente and Toribio who participated in the conservative rebellion of Estévez. The events of the Second French intervention in Mexico and the Second Mexican Empire didn't take any affect on Almada until August 1865, when the city of Álamos was occupied by a section of French auxiliary troops, commanded by the imperialist chief Fortino Vizcaíno. Almada then swore his allegiance to Santiago Campillo and General Isidoro Teódulo Garnier and began his military career at Guaymas and began exerting his influence across Sonora in favor of the Empire. Almada immediately moved to Navojoa to influence the Mayo to his cause. Days later however, he violently retreated to Álamos, which had been recovered by General Antonio Rosales. During the ensuing Battle of Álamos, Rosales was defeated and killed by Almada's forces with the aggravating circumstance that one of his sons was wrongly identified as being responsible for the union with Vizcaíno. He kept the region in his power and was promoted by Maximiliano I to the rank of colonel, his appointment as the prefect of the department of Álamos and the Officer's Cross of the Order of the Mexican Eagle.

As a reward for his participation in the Battle of Álamos, on November 18, 1865, he was awarded the Order of Guadalupe along with the other chiefs and officers who had participated in it. He took his weapons to the region of the Fuerte River, where he left a garrison and on January 7, 1866, he was defeated and evicted from Álamos by the Republican troops commanded by General Ángel Martínez. He fleed for the center of the State to reorganize his forces with surprising energy but on May 4, he was defeated by General Martínez himself in Hermosillo, although a few hours later his men took revenge and defeated the Republicans who had to give up the plaza and he fought with Colonel Palacio in Minas Nuevas and returned to occupy the city of Álamos. On August 20, he was forced to vacate the town by the Republican soldiers and he withdrew in the direction of Navojoa from where he brought reinforcements with which he attacked again and was completely defeated on September 2. The Mexican Empire languished because at the same time, Edvard Emile Langberg and Refugio Tánori had been defeated at the Battle of Guadalupe and took the road to Guaymas where he embarked with many other compromised, seeking salvation. Martínez recovered the port and armed a ship under the command of Colonel Salazar Bustamente, which went in pursuit of the fugitives and reached some off the coast of Santa Rosalía and others in Mulegé. At the time of the arrest, without any resistance, Almada was assassinated by Captain Abato Avilés, in revenge for the execution of his brother Lorenzo at Álamos months before by a Court Martial sentence.

References

1822 births
1866 deaths
Mexican monarchists
Military personnel from Sonora
Second French intervention in Mexico
19th-century Mexican military personnel
Assassinated military personnel
Assassinated Mexican people